Szilárd Éles (born 1 October 1987 in Berettyóújfalu) is a Hungarian football player who currently plays for BFC Siófok on loan from Mezőkövesd-Zsóry SE.

References

1987 births
Living people
People from Berettyóújfalu
Hungarian footballers
Association football defenders
Debreceni VSC players
Létavértes SC players
Nyíregyháza Spartacus FC players
BFC Siófok players
Mezőkövesdi SE footballers
Nemzeti Bajnokság I players
Sportspeople from Hajdú-Bihar County